Paulus Fredericus Cornelius Jansen (born 2 March 1954) is a Dutch civil engineer and Socialist Party politician who served as a member of the House of Representatives from 30 November 2006 until 14 May 2014.

Jansen was born in Roermond and studied architectural engineering at Eindhoven University of Technology. From 1995 to 2003 he was a member as well as SP group leader in the provincial council of the province of Utrecht. From 2001 to 2006 he was a member as well as SP group leader of the municipal council of the city of Utrecht. He became a member of the House of Representatives on 30 November 2006. In the House, he focused on matters of natural environment, climate change, spatial planning, water management, housing, energy and environmental noise. He officially left the House of Representatives on 13 May 2014 and was permanently replaced by Tjitske Siderius, who until then had temporary replaced Renske Leijten. He served as alderman for housing, animal welfare and sport in the city of Utrecht between 8 May 2014 and 7 June 2018.

Electoral history

References 

 Parlement.com biography

External links 

 House of Representatives biography 

1954 births
Living people
Dutch civil engineers
Aldermen of Utrecht
Eindhoven University of Technology alumni
Members of the House of Representatives (Netherlands)
Members of the Provincial Council of Utrecht
People from Roermond
Secretaries of the Socialist Party (Netherlands)
Socialist Party (Netherlands) politicians
21st-century Dutch politicians